Pandit Badri Datt Pande (15 February 1882 – 13 January 1965) was an Indian historian, freedom fighter, Social Reformer and subsequently, a Member of Parliament from Almora in independent India.

Along with Govind Ballabh Pant, he was one of the foremost political leaders from Kumaon (then a part of the United Provinces in British India). He was popularly known as, and remains remembered in the region as, the Kumaon Kesari. This title is derived after "Coolie-Begar movement" in 1921.
He was the editor of a newspaper called Almora Akhbar which was shut by the British bureaucracy for its anti government stance . Thereafter he raised money to start a new newspaper named "Shakti" on 15 oct 1918 the day of Vijaydhashmi.
The society of Kumaon, during those days, was plagued by a social system called Nayak Pratha, where it was acceptable for Nayak families to sell their daughters into prostitution. Badri Dutt fought against the system which ultimately led to the enactment of legislation to stop the practice.

His book in Hindi on the history of Kumaon is a compendium and a treatise on Kumaon, and is titled, Kumaon Ka Itihas.

References

1882 births
1965 deaths
Indian independence activists from Uttarakhand
Lok Sabha members from Uttar Pradesh
India MPs 1952–1957
Indian National Congress politicians from Uttarakhand
Journalists in British India